Nicolas or Nicolás may refer to masculine given names cognate to English Nicholas.

The given name Nicolas is widely used in France and Brazil. The variant Nicolás is widely used in Spanish-speaking countries. The variant Nicola, while mistakenly considered feminine in parts of the English-speaking world, is a popular male name in Italy, although Nicolas is also sometimes used, especially amongst Italian Americans and Latin Americans of Italian descent.

People

Nicolas
Prince Nicolas of Belgium (born 2005), grandson of King Albert II
Prince Nicolas, Duke of Ångermanland (born 2015), grandson of King Carl XVI Gustaf
Nicolas-Alexandre, marquis de Ségur (1695–1755), French aristocrat
Nicolas Anelka (born 1979), French footballer
Nicolas Cage (born 1964), American actor
Nicolas Chalvin (born 1969), French conductor and oboist
Nicolas Chumachenco (1944–2020), Polish violinist
Nicolas Coutelot (born 1977), a French tennis player
Nicolas Devilder (born 1980), Coutelot's French compatriot and tennis player
Nicolas Flamel ( 1330–1418), French alchemist
Nicolas Hayek (1928–2010), Lebanese-American Swiss businessman and founder of Swatch
Nicolas Heurtaut (1720–1771), French wood carver and furniture designer
Nicolas de Jong (born 1988), a Dutch basketball player
Nicolas Kiefer (born 1977), a German former tennis player
Nicolas Mahut (born 1982), Devilder's French compatriot and tennis player
Nicolas Meizonnet (born 1983), French politician
Nicolas Nkoulou (born 1990), Cameroonian footballer
Nicolas Roeg (1928–2018), English film director
Nicolas Rothwell, Australian journalist and author
Nicolas Sarkozy (born 1955), French politician and former president of France
Nicolas "Cole" Turner (born 2000), American football player

Nicolás
(Spanish variant) 
 Nicolás Aguirre (basketball) (born 1988), a professional Argentine basketball player
 Nicolás Aguirre (footballer) (born 1990), an Argentine professional association football player
 Nicolás Almagro (born 1985), a Spanish professional tennis player
 Nicolás Falczuk (born 1986), an Argentine professional association football player
 Nicolás Avellaneda (1837–1885), an Argentine journalist, professor, and President
 Nicolás Zúñiga y Miranda (1865–1925), a Mexican presidential candidate and eccentric
 Nicolás Guillén (1902–1989), a Cuban poet, journalist, political activist, and writer
 Nicolás Guillén Landrián (1938–2003), a Cuban experimental filmmaker and painter
 Nicolás Lapentti (born 1976), an Ecuadorian professional tennis player
 Nicolás Maduro (born 1962), president of Venezuela
 Nicolás Massú (born 1979), a Chilean Olympic champion tennis player
 Nicolás Palacios (1854–1931), a Chilean physician, writer and political activist
 Nicolás Pauls (born 1973), an Argentine actor
 Nicolás Pereira (born 1970), a retired Venezuelan tennis player
 Nicolás Tauber (born 1980), an Argentine-Israeli professional association football player
 Nicolás Terol (born 1988), a professional Spanish motorcycle road race
 Nicolás Valansi (born 1979), Argentine-Israeli footballer

See also

Nicolas (disambiguation)#Surname
Nicola (name)
Nicolae (name)
Nicolai (given name)
Nicolaj
Nicolao
Nicolau
Nicolay

English masculine given names
French masculine given names
Spanish masculine given names
German masculine given names